Meclocycline (INN) is a tetracycline antibiotic. It is used topically (i.e. for skin infections) as it is totally insoluble in water and may cause liver and kidney damage if given systemically.

Its production for medical use has been discontinued. It was previously sold in the United States by Pfizer under the brand name Meclan.

References 

Chloroarenes
Tetracycline antibiotics
Triketones